Buttiauxella noackiae  is a Gram-negative bacterium from the genus of Buttiauxella which has been isolated from a snail in Sydney in Australia. Buttiauxella noackiae is named after Katrin Noack.

References

Further reading 
 

Enterobacteriaceae
Bacteria described in 1996